Uke-Hunt is a ukulele-based cover band fronted by Spike Slawson from Me First and the Gimme Gimmes. Although both this and the Gimmes are cover bands, they have very different approaches. While the Gimmes generally pick non-rock songs, rock them out and speed them up to turn them into punk music, the songs picked for this band are generally upbeat songs that are then slowed down and mellowed out.

History
The band's origins start with Slawson learning to play ukulele when Me First and the Gimme Gimmes would perform their cover of R. Kelly's "I Believe I Can Fly" live. Slawson would then learn different songs on ukulele which led to this band. The band initially played on the San Francisco Wharf under the name Uke Hammer. The band was initially made up of Slawson on ukulele and vocals, Randy Burk on percussion and vocals and Jamin Barton on various instruments, including saxophone, melodica and harmonica.

The band first appeared on the 2013 Fat Music for Fest People III compilation before releasing their debut single, "The Prettiest Star", in April 2014, followed by their debut, self-titled album in June 2014. The following year, the band went on their first national tour.

Members
Spike Slawson – lead vocals
Jamin Barton - saw, saxophone
Randy Burk - percussion
Joe Raposo - bass

Discography

"The Prettiest Star" 7" (2014)

"The Prettiest Star" was the first release by the band. It was released on April 29, 2014 by Fat Wreck Chords.

Track listing

Uke-Hunt (2014)

Uke-Hunt is the debut album by the band. It was released on June 10, 2014 by Fat Wreck Chords.

Track listing

Compilation appearances
The following releases feature songs by the band.
 Fat Music for Fest People III (2013, Fat Wreck Chords)
 Features "Animal Farm", later released on Uke-Hunt
 Fat Music for Fest People IV (2014, Fat Wreck Chords)
 Features "Needles and Pins" from Uke-Hunt
 Mild in the Streets: Fat Music Unplugged (2016, Fat Wreck Chords)
 Features the exclusive "Xanadu"

References

External links
 

Fat Wreck Chords artists
Musical groups established in 2013
2013 establishments in California